Gunaratne or Gunaratna (Sinhala: ගුණරත්න) is a Sinhalese name that may refer to
Gunaratna Weerakoon, Sri Lankan politician
Asela Gunaratne (born 1986), Sri Lankan cricketer
C. V. Gunaratne, Sri Lankan Minister of Industries Development
Chandima Gunaratne (born 1982), Sri Lankan cricketer
Chathura Gunaratne (born 1982), Sri Lankan association football midfielder
D. Shelton A. Gunaratne, 	Sri Lankan American professor of mass communications 
Dedunu Gunaratne, Sri Lankan cricketer
Dilesh Gunaratne, Sri Lankan cricketer
Kamal Gunaratne, Sri Lankan military general
M. H. Gunaratne, Sri Lankan military officer
Nimal Gunaratne, Director of Health Services of the Sri Lanka Air Force 
Pulasthi Gunaratne (born 1973), Sri Lankan cricketer
R. D. Gunaratne, Sri Lankan chess player and scientist
Rohan Gunaratna (born 1961), Singaporean analyst on security affairs
Sarath Kumara Gunaratna, Sri Lankan politician
Thalika Gunaratne (born 1975), Sri Lankan cricketer
Tudor Gunaratne (born 1966), Sri Lankan cricketer

Sinhalese surnames